Elland Lower Edge is an area of Rastrick near the town of Brighouse, in the Calderdale District, in the English county of West Yorkshire.


References 
A-Z West Yorkshire (page 119)

Geography of Calderdale
Elland